The women's coxless pair competition at the 1984 Summer Olympics took place at took place at Lake Casitas, California, United States of America.

With only 6 boats in the competition, a single race was held.

Results

The final was held on August 4, with calm winds and 18 °C temperatures. At the halfway mark, the Romanian boat had opened a 2.6 second lead, which stretched to 3.5 seconds by the end. The Canadians and West Germans were relatively close for second and third halfway through, but the Canadians pulled away to take the silver medal relatively easily. The Dutch, American, and British boats were well behind the leaders; the Americans had a slight lead over the Dutch for 4th, but the Dutch team overtook them in the second half. The British team finished 6th, well behind the rest of the field.

References

Rowing at the 1984 Summer Olympics
Women's rowing at the 1984 Summer Olympics